Lisa Atangana Belibi (born 3 October 1997) is a Cameroonian handball player for Anglet Biarritz and the Cameroonian national team.

She participated at the 2017 World Women's Handball Championship.

References

1997 births
Living people
Cameroonian female handball players
Expatriate handball players
Cameroonian expatriates in France
20th-century Cameroonian women
21st-century Cameroonian women